The former New Iberia High School building is a historic structure located at 415 Center Street in New Iberia, Louisiana.  It is a large Classical Revival building, three stories in height, built out of brick and stone.  It was built in 1926 and enlarged in 1939 to a design by William T. Nolan, and is the parish's only example of Classical Revival design.  It served as a high school until 1966, and as a middle school thereafter until 1990.  The building has since been converted to residential use and is currently hosting the School Days Apartments.

The building was listed on the National Register of Historic Places on March 17, 1994.

See also
National Register of Historic Places listings in Iberia Parish, Louisiana

References

National Register of Historic Places in Iberia Parish, Louisiana
Neoclassical architecture in Louisiana
School buildings completed in 1926
Schools in Iberia Parish, Louisiana
1926 establishments in Louisiana